The 1986 Madrid Open was a men's tennis tournament played on outdoor clay courts in Madrid, Spain that was part of the 1986 Nabisco Grand Prix circuit. It was the 15th edition of the tournament and was played from 28 April until 4 May 1986. First-seeded Joakim Nyström won the singles title.

Finals

Singles

 Joakim Nyström defeated  Kent Carlsson 6–1, 6–1
 It was Nyström's 5th singles title and the 12th of his career.

Doubles

 Anders Järryd /  Joakim Nyström defeated  Jesús Colás /  David de Miguel 6–2, 6–2

References

External links
 ITF tournament edition details

Madrid Tennis Grand Prix
Madrid
Madrid